Melissa Venema (born April 12, 1995, in Alkmaar) is a Dutch trumpeter.

Life
Melissa started playing recorder at age 6 and moved to trumpet by age 8. When she was 10, she auditioned successfully at the Conservatorium van Amsterdam, training under Frits Damrow, a world-famous trumpeter. She has since performed in numerous public broadcasts, including an internationally broadcast performance of Haydn's Trumpet Concerto in the Crystal Cathedral in Garden Grove, California.

Melissa also plays on her  own custom made Yamaha trumpet, and four other trumpets.

Awards
Melissa has won several awards over the years, with more recent achievements including taking third place at the Chicago International Brass Festival and several prizes in the Princess Christina Competition. In 2010, she received the Encouragement Prize of Culture of the City Zaanstad. She has also worked with the violinist André Rieu.

Discography
 Melissa voor U (2006) 
Melissa in Concert (2009)
 Melissa from the Heart (2010)
The Trumpet is My Voice (2012)

References

External links

 Melissa Venema Homepage
 Il Silenzio

1995 births
Living people
Protestant Church Christians from the Netherlands
Dutch trumpeters
People from Alkmaar
21st-century trumpeters